Diana Louise Strassmann is an American economist, currently Carolyn and Fred McManis Distinguished Professor of Humanities at Rice University, and also co-founder of International Association for Feminist Economics and its journal Feminist Economics.

Education
After graduating from East Lansing High School in East Lansing, Michigan in 1973, Strassmann completed her AB in Economics at Princeton University in 1977, her MA from Harvard University in Economics from in 1982 and her PhD from Harvard in 1983.

Career
Strassman is Director of the Rice University Program on Poverty, Justice, and Human Capabilities, co-founder of International Association for Feminist Economics (IAFFE) and founding editor of the IAFFE journal Feminist Economics.

Publications
In 2011 she co-authored Feminist economics: feminism, economics, and well-being a "major three-volume research collection that demonstrates the breadth and significance of feminist scholarship in economics."

References

Living people
American economists
American feminists
Feminist economists
Harvard University alumni
Princeton University alumni
Rice University faculty
Year of birth missing (living people)
American women economists
21st-century American women